Ormetica sypalettius is a moth of the family Erebidae. It was described by Seitz in 1921. It is found in Colombia.

References

Ormetica
Moths described in 1921